Jin Soon-jin (born 1 March 1974) is a retired South Korean footballer.

Club career 
He played for FC Seoul, then known as Anyang LG Cheetahs, Daegu FC and Jeonnam Dragons. In 1999, he had a serious car accident.

Honours

Club 
 Anyang LG Cheetahs
 K League (1) 2000

References

External links 
 

1971 births
Living people
Association football forwards
South Korean footballers
FC Seoul players
Daegu FC players
Jeonnam Dragons players
K League 1 players
Sangji University alumni